Kaunas District Municipality (Kauno rajono savivaldybė) is one of 60 municipalities in Lithuania. The seat of the municipality is the city of Kaunas, which does not belong to the municipality but is a separate administrative unit. It surrounds the Kaunas City Municipality from the north, west and south, while in the east Kaunas district municipality borders Kaišiadorys District Municipality. Kaunas District Municipality has the second largest international airport in Lithuania (Kaunas International Airport), and is well connected by major roads (A1 highway and Via Baltica), as well as railways with other cities of Lithuania.

Elderships 
Kaunas District Municipality is divided into 25 elderships:

Geography

Nature 
The rivers Neman, Neris, Nevėžis, Jiesia and Dubysa pass through the Kaunas District area. Kaunas Reservoir borders the east side of the district. It also has 7 lakes and 14 ponds in the area.

The largest forests are: Dubrava, Padauguva, Varluva, Zapyškis. Girionys Park is home to some rare and exotic plant life. Žalgiris memorial park is located at Cinkiškė village.

Mounds 
There are a total of 20 nationally recognized mounds located in Kaunas District Municipality area. More notable mounds are:
 Piepaliai mound
 Lantainiai mound
 Bernatoniai mound
 Pypliai mound
 Samylai mound
 Pakalniškiai mound
 Guogai mound
 Ringovė mound
 Jaučakiai mound
 Altoniškiai mound
 Jadagoniai mound

Preserves 

Kaunas District has a large number of nature reserves. Including:
 Arlaviškės botanical preserve 
 Dubrava reserve area
 Kamša botanical-zoological preserve
 Kaunas Reservoir Regional Park
 Nevėžis landscape preserve

Settlements 
Kaunas District Municipality consists of:
 3 cities - Ežerėlis, Garliava, Vilkija
 10 towns - Akademija, Babtai, Čekiškė, Domeikava, Kačerginė, Kulautuva, Garliava, Domeikava and Vandžiogala
 370 villages

Culture 

An ethnic culture and crafts museum can be found in Vilkija, Babtai has a museum of ethnography and in Saliai there is an underground press museum. Among other noteworthy places are a racing circuit in Kačerginė called Nemuno žiedas, also a total of 19 surviving manors (the most famous are Raudondvaris, and "Babtynas" located in Žemaitkiemis), the old church of Zapyškis (Church of St. John the Baptist) and Monastery of Discalced Carmelites in Paštuva.

References

External links
Website of Kaunas district municipality

Municipalities of Kaunas County
Municipalities of Lithuania